HMS Oberon was the prototype for the  of the Royal Navy.

Design 
Oberon was the prototype for the s and was initially named O1 but renamed in 1924, becoming the first named British submarine. Ordered under the 1923 programme, she was the fifth ship of the Royal Navy to carry the name Oberon. The submarine was built in response to the demise of the Anglo-Japanese Alliance in 1922, which necessitated a need for a long-range patrol submarine capable of operations in the Far East.

She displaced  standard and  normal while surfaced, but displaced  normal while submerged. These gave her a maximum speed of  surface and  submerged  – both short of a planned  surfaced and  submerged.

She was capable of carrying  of oil, mostly in leakage-prone external tanks riveted to the hull, which were replaced by welded tanks in a 1937 refit.

Initially armed with a single QF 4 inch/40 naval gun Mk IV (replaced with the Mk XII in the 1930s) for surface fighting, Oberon had eight  torpedo tubes – six bow and two in the stern. The submarine could carry sixteen torpedoes, originally Mark IV but later replaced by Mark VIII. Oberon was the first submarine of the Royal Navy equipped with asdic while under construction, and was additionally equipped with Type 709 hydrophones and a Type SF direction finder. Modifications made during the Second World War included the addition of an Oerlikon 20 mm cannon for anti-aircraft defense and a Type 291W  radio direction finder for air and surface warning.

Construction and service 
She was laid down on 22 March 1924, launched on 24 September 1926 at the Chatham Dockyard and commissioned on 24 August 1927. As a result of torsional vibration in her powerplant, the submarine was never deployed to the Far East. Oberon was stationed at Portsmouth between 1927 and 1931, then moved to the Mediterranean before returning to Portsmouth in 1934. On 11 October 1935, she collided with the destroyer  at Devonport. Placed in reserve in 1937, Oberon was recommissioned on 2 August 1939 and was used for training during the Second World War. She was decommissioned at Blyth on 5 July 1944 and was sold for scrap on 24 August 1945. Oberon was scrapped at Dunston by Clayton and Davie.

She was assigned a pennant number of 21.P, which was changed to 21.N in 1939 and to N.21 in 1940.

Notes

References

External links 

 British Pathé newsreel footage of Oberon, 1927

 

Ships built in Chatham
1926 ships
Odin-class submarines of the Royal Navy